Anel Hadžić (born 16 August 1989) is a Bosnian former professional footballer who played as a defensive midfielder.

Hadžić started his professional career at Ried, before joining Sturm Graz in 2013. Three years later, he was transferred to Eskişehirspor. Later that year, he signed with Fehérvár. In 2021, Hadžić moved to Wacker Innsbruck. He switched to Wels later that year.

A former Austrian youth international, Hadžić made his senior international debut for Bosnia and Herzegovina in 2014, earning 14 caps until 2017. He represented the nation at their first major championship, the 2014 FIFA World Cup.

Club career

Early career
Because of the outbreak of Bosnian War, Hadžić's family fled from his native Bosnia and Herzegovina and moved to Austria, where he started playing football at a local club, before joining Ried's youth academy in 1999. He made his professional against Austria Kärnten on 29 September 2007 at the age of 17. On 25 October 2009, he scored his first professional goal against Red Bull Salzburg.

In May 2013, he switched to Sturm Graz.

In January 2016, he was transferred to Turkish side Eskişehirspor.

Fehérvár
In August 2016, Hadžić signed a two-year deal with Hungarian outfit Fehérvár. He made his official debut for the team in Magyar Kupa game against Pécs on 14 September and managed to score a goal. Two weeks later, he made his league debut against Honvéd. On 22 October, he scored his first league goal in a triumph over Paks. He won his first title with the club on 27 May 2018, when they were crowned league champions.

In June, Hadžić extended his contract until June 2020.

He played his 100th game for the side against Ferencváros on 20 April 2019.

Later stage of career
In January 2021, Hadžić moved to Wacker Innsbruck.

In July, he joined Wels.

He announced his retirement from football on 17 December.

International career

Despite representing Austria at various youth levels, Hadžić decided to play for Bosnia and Herzegovina at senior level.

In September 2013, his request to change sports citizenship from Austrian to Bosnian was approved by FIFA. Subsequently, he received his first senior call-up in February 2014, for a friendly game against Egypt, and debuted in that game on 5 March.

In June 2014, Hadžić was named in Bosnia and Herzegovina's squad for 2014 FIFA World Cup, country's first major competition. He made his tournament debut in the last group match against Iran on 25 June.

Personal life
Hadžić's younger brother Elvir is also a professional footballer.

He married his long-time girlfriend Alma in June 2019. Together they have a son named Rayan.

Career statistics

Club

International

Honours
Ried
Austrian Cup: 2010–11

Fehérvár
Nemzeti Bajnokság I: 2017–18
Magyar Kupa: 2018–19

References

External links

1989 births
Living people
People from Velika Kladuša
Bosniaks of Bosnia and Herzegovina
Bosnia and Herzegovina Muslims
Bosnia and Herzegovina refugees
Bosnia and Herzegovina emigrants to Austria
Naturalised citizens of Austria
Austrian footballers
Austria youth international footballers
Austria under-21 international footballers
Austrian expatriate footballers
Bosnia and Herzegovina footballers
Bosnia and Herzegovina international footballers
Bosnia and Herzegovina expatriate footballers
Association football midfielders
FC Wels players
SV Ried players
SK Sturm Graz players
Eskişehirspor footballers
Fehérvár FC players
FC Wacker Innsbruck (2002) players
Austrian Football Bundesliga players
Süper Lig players
Nemzeti Bajnokság I players
2. Liga (Austria) players
Austrian Regionalliga players
Expatriate footballers in Turkey
Expatriate footballers in Hungary
Austrian expatriate sportspeople in Turkey
Austrian expatriate sportspeople in Hungary
Bosnia and Herzegovina expatriate sportspeople in Turkey
Bosnia and Herzegovina expatriate sportspeople in Hungary
2014 FIFA World Cup players